Rheinfelden is a municipality in the canton of Aargau in Switzerland, seat of the district of Rheinfelden.  It is located 15 kilometres east of Basel.  The name means the fields of the Rhine, as the town is located on the High Rhine.  It is home to Feldschlösschen, the most popular beer in Switzerland. The city is across the river from Rheinfelden in Baden-Württemberg; the two cities were joined until Napoleon Bonaparte fixed the Germany–Switzerland border on the Rhine in 1802 and are still socially and economically tied.

Geography

The wooded, gently-rising foothills of the Tafeljura lie south of the town. These are the Steppberg (above sea level) and the "Berg", both in the south-east. Between these two hills lie the deeply incised valleys of the Magdenerbach.

Of this area, about 20.7% is used for agricultural purposes, while 50.0% is forested. Of the rest of the land, 22.6% is settled (buildings or roads) and 6.7% is unproductive land. Of the agricultural land,  is used for orchards and vineyards,  is fields and grasslands. Rivers and lakes cover  in the municipality.Regionalporträts 2017: Swiss Federal Statistical Office  accessed 18 May 2017

The highest point is located on "Berg", the lowest point is on the Rhine. Neighbouring cities are Kaiseraugst to the west, Olsberg to the south-west, Magden to the south and Möhlin to the east (all in the Aargau); over the river in Germany lies Rheinfelden, Baden-Württemberg.

History

The area around Rheinfelden was already settled in the Middle Stone Age, around 10,000 years before the present day. At that time, people lived in the "Hermitage", a small natural cave next to the current highway. In the year 45 BC, a few kilometres further west, the settlement Augusta Raurica was founded, the first Roman town in Switzerland, near modern Kaiseraugst. In the plains at Rheinfelden was then a large estate. Towards the end of the 4th century a border fort was constructed at the western settlement.

Rheinfelden is first mentioned about 851 as Rifelt and in the first half of the 12th century it was called Rinfelden. In the second half of the 10th century, the entire Fricktal area—the Frick valley, a finger of land in northwestern Switzerland east of present-day Basel, between the Jura Mountains to the south, and the High Rhine border with present-day Germany to the north—was within Kingdom of Burgundy. At that time, Rheinfelden was granted to the von Wetterau family. They later adopted the title of Count of Rheinfelden. The Rheinfeldens built a fortress, "Stein", on the strategically located island; a riverbank settlement stood at the "Altenburg". The last of this comital line was Rudolf of Rheinfelden, Duke of Swabia (1057–79) and German antiking (1077–80) during the Investiture Controversy.

When Rudolf died on October 15, 1080, in Merseburg, his territories were inherited by Berthold II of Zähringen.but the town went to his son Otto and his family the von Wetter's. Berhold's second son, Conrad, awarded market rights to the city, making it the oldest Zähringerstadt in Switzerland and the oldest city in the Aargau; in 1150 he also had the first bridge built across the Rhine, between Konstanz and Strasbourg. In 1218, Berthold V died without issue. In 1225, Rheinfelden gained Reichsfreiheit to become an Imperial City.

A little over a century later, in 1330, the city pledged itself to the Habsburgs, becoming a part of Further Austria. In 1445, when the Habsburgs were fighting the Old Zürich War, insurgents destroyed the castle on the "Inseli", due to the city's allegiance with Basel. After a siege lasting several months, Rheinfelden was returned to Austrian subjugation in 1449. After the Waldshut War from 1468, all of Fricktal Burgundy pledged to the Habsburgs. After the Burgundians were beaten by the Old Swiss Confederacy in the Burgundian Wars, Rheinfelden land, not Title, was restored to Austria in 1477.

During the 17th century, there was very little time during which the city enjoyed peace. During the Rappenkrieg, a peasant uprising that lasted from 1612 until 1614, the city was unsuccessfully besieged but devastated. Between 1633 and 1638 the Thirty Years' War reached Fricktal, where Rheinfelden played an important role. On 15 July 1633, Swedish and French troops devastated the city. On 5 February 1638, the city was besieged by Protestant troops under the command of Bernhard of Saxe-Weimar. On 28 February the Battle of Rheinfelden began, as the city was attacked by numerically-superior Imperial and Bavarian troops under the command of Johann von Werth and Federico Savelli. The Protestants lost this encounter and withdrew. Bernhard brought them weapons, but in the second action, on 3 March, they were victorious, as he and his men unexpectedly re-appeared on the battlefield; both Savelli and Werth were captured.

By the end of the Thirty Years' War, the Austrians had built a fortress on the island to secure the southwestern border of the Breisgau. In 1678, French troops under the command of François de Créquy fired at the city. In 1745, during the War of the Austrian Succession, the French made a fortress on the same ground and also blasted a portion of the city wall. On 17 July 1796 Rheinfelden was again occupied and looted by the French.

As a result of the Treaty of Campo Formio in 1797, the Fricktal became a French protectorate, forming the front line between the French Revolutionary and the Austrian troops in the War of the Second Coalition. On 20 February 1802 Rheinfelden was made a district capital of the newly created Canton of Fricktal, (Principality of Frickgau), joining the Helvetic Republic in August, the point at which the city became decisively Swiss. After the removal of the governor Sebastian Fahrländer at the end of September 1802, the seat of the cantonal government was relocated here from Laufenburg. With the beginning of the Reichsdeputationshauptschluss (the German Mediatisation), Napoleon Bonaparte dissolved the canton of Fricktal. Since 19 March 1803, Rheinfelden has been the capital of a district of the same name, in the canton of Aargau. With the Reichsdeputationshauptschluss, the remaining (German) parts of the city lost their independence to the Grand Duchy of Baden, becoming Rheinfelden, Germany.

Mayors

1945: Eugen Walz
1945–1946: Franz Fischer
1946–1948: Alois Maier
1948–1988: Herbert King
1988–2012: Eberhard Niethammer
since 2012: Klaus Eberhardt (born 1956)

Coat of arms
The blazon of the municipal coat of arms is Barry of Six Or and Gules with three Mullets of the first.Demographics
, 27.6% of the population are foreign nationals. Over the last 10 years (1997–2007) the population has changed at a rate of 6.1%. Most of the population speaks German (82.9%), with Italian being second most common (3.8%) and Serbo-Croatian being third (2.0%).

The age distribution, in Rheinfelden is; 1,031 children or 9.1% of the population are between 0 and 9 years old and 1,173 teenagers or 10.4% are between 10 and 19.  Of the adult population, 1,418 people or 12.6% of the population are between 20 and 29 years old.  1,652 people or 14.6% are between 30 and 39, 1,904 people or 16.9% are between 40 and 49, and 1,544 people or 13.7% are between 50 and 59.  The senior population distribution is 1,260 people or 11.2% of the population are between 60 and 69 years old, 790 people or 7.0% are between 70 and 79, there are 441 people or 3.9% who are between 80 and 89, and there are 77 people or 0.7% who are 90 and older.

, there were 682 homes with 1 or 2 persons in the household, 2,876 homes with 3 or 4 persons in the household, and 1,250 homes with 5 or more persons in the household.  , there were 4,953 private households (homes and apartments) in the municipality, and an average of 2.1 persons per household.   there were 958 single family homes (or 15.7% of the total) out of a total of 6,087 homes and apartments.  There were a total of 86 empty apartments for a 1.4% vacancy rate.  , the construction rate of new housing units was 2.8 new units per 1000 residents.

In the 2007 federal election the most popular party was the SP which received 27.64% of the vote.  The next three most popular parties were the SVP (26.15%), the FDP (16.05%) and the CVP (11.13%).  In the federal election, a total of 2,934 votes were cast, and the voter turnout was 42.9%.

The historical population is given in the following table:

Heritage sites of national significance
The entire old town of Rheinfelden is designated as part of the Inventory of Swiss Heritage Sites. There are seven sites in Rheinfelden that are listed as Swiss heritage sites of national significance. Two religious buildings are on the list, the Christian Catholic collegiate church of St. Martin and the Johanniter Chapel at Johannitergasse 70.  Three fortifications are on the list; the Heimenholz and the Pferrichgraben which were both part of the old Roman era Rhine fortications and the entire medieval city wall.  The last two buildings on the list are the Feldschlösschen brewery at Feldschlösschenstrasse 34 and the former Gasthof (combination hotel and restaurant) zum goldenen Adler at Obertorplatz 4.

Economy
, Rheinfelden had an unemployment rate of 3.83%.  , there were 40 people employed in the primary economic sector and about 9 businesses involved in this sector.  1,313 people are employed in the secondary sector and there are 86 businesses in this sector.  4,420 people are employed in the tertiary sector, with 432 businesses in this sector.

 there were 5,437 workers who lived in the municipality.  Of these, 3,453 or about 63.5% of the residents worked outside Rheinfelden while 2,807 people commuted into the municipality for work.  There were a total of 4,791 jobs (of at least 6 hours per week) in the municipality.  Of the working population, 26.3% used public transportation to get to work, and 39.2% used a private car.

Religion
Of the rest of the population, there were 285 individuals (or about 2.67% of the population) who belonged to the Christian Catholic faith.

Transport
Rheinfelden sits on the Bözberg railway line and served by local and regional trains at Rheinfelden and Rheinfelden Augarten.

Education
In Rheinfelden about 73.6% of the population (between age 25–64) have completed either non-mandatory upper secondary education or additional higher education (either university or a Fachhochschule).  Of the school age population, there are 667 students attending primary school, there are 251 students attending secondary school, there are 386 students attending tertiary or university level schooling, and there are 18 students who are seeking a job after school in the municipality.

Rheinfelden is home to the Stadtbibliothek Rheinfelden'' library.  The library has 16,442 books or other media, and loaned out 58,291 items in the same year.  It was open a total of 250 days with average of 30 hours per week during that year.

Notable people 

 Hedwig of Habsburg  (ca.1260 Rheinfelden, Swabia – 1303) Margravine of Brandenburg 1279-1285/1286
 Rudolf II, Duke of Austria (ca. 1270 in Rheinfelden, Duchy of Swabia – 1290) Duke of Austria and Styria from 1282 to 1283
 Jacob Sprenger (1436/1438 in Rheinfelden, Further Austria – 1495) a Dominican Friar 
 Jakob Christof Rad (1799 in Rheinfelden - 1871) a Swiss-born physician and industrial manager
 Andreas Kyburz (born 1988 in Rheinfelden) a Swiss orienteering competitor
 Ivan Rakitić (born 1988 in Rheinfelden) a Croatian professional footballer who plays for Spanish club Sevilla
 Yannick Käser (born 1992 in Rheinfelden) a Swiss breaststroke swimmer
 Alexander Ursenbacher (born 1996 in Rheinfelden) a Swiss professional snooker player

Weather

Notes and references

External links

  Official website
  Feldschlösschen brewery
  Rheinfelden images

 
Cities in Switzerland
Twin cities
Municipalities of Aargau
Populated places on the Rhine
Spa towns in Switzerland
Cultural property of national significance in Aargau
Germany–Switzerland border crossings
1080 disestablishments
States and territories established in the 10th century
Divided cities